Henestaris is a genus of mostly European bugs, it is typical of the subfamily Henestarinae.

Species
The Lygaeoidea Species File lists:
 Henestaris halophilus (Burmeister, 1835)
 Henestaris irroratus Horvath, 1892
 Henestaris kareli Hoberlandt, 1956
 Henestaris laticeps (Curtis, 1837) - type species (as Henestaris genei Spinola = H. laticeps laticeps)
 Henestaris oschanini Bergroth, 1919
 Henestaris thoracicus Schmidt, 1939

References

External Links

Hemiptera of Europe
Pentatomomorpha genera
Lygaeoidea